São João Nepomuceno is a municipality in the southeast of Minas Gerais, Brazil close to the state border with Rio de Janeiro.

References

Municipalities in Minas Gerais